Kim Alexandrovich Breitburg (10 February 1955, Lvov, Ukrainian SSR, USSR) is a Russian composer, singer, keyboardist, author of more than 600 songs, 5 art rock suites and 7 musicals. Breitburg, who first came to prominence as a founder and frontman of the Soviet progressive rock band Dialog (1978–1991) in the later years became a successful mainstream entrepreneur; among his best known projects are the popular reality talent shows "People's Artist", "The Secret of Success" and "The Battle of Choirs".

Members of Dialog band in 1990s organized the Dialog project aimed to searching for young talents in music. In creation of this project, Kim Breitburg was assisted by his colleagues Evgeniy Fridland and Vadim Botnaruk.

References

External links
 Kim Breitburg. The band's frontman biography at the Dialog unofficial site.

Russian male composers
Russian rock singers
1955 births
Musicians from Lviv
Living people
Russian record producers
Soviet male composers
Progressive rock musicians
Male musical theatre composers
20th-century Russian male singers
20th-century Russian singers